Goniographa decussa is a moth of the family Noctuidae. It is found in the western Tien-Shan Mountains.

The wingspan is 27–34 mm.

External links
A Revision of the Palaearctic species of the Eugraphe (Hübner, 1821-1816) Generic complex. Parti. The genera Eugraphe and Goniographa (Lepidoptera, Noctuidae)

Noctuinae
Moths described in 1897